The Gullah-Geechee Cultural Heritage Corridor is a federal  National Heritage Area in the United States, representing the significant story of the Gullah-Geechee people for maintaining their cultural traditions, and for being a reflection of the values of ingenuity, pride, and perseverance. The intent of the designation is to help us to preserve and interpret the traditional cultural practices, sites, and resources associated with Gullah-Geechee people. Gullah-Geechee Cultural Heritage Corridor, and the federal Gullah-Geechee Cultural Heritage Corridor Commission established to oversee it, were designated by an act of Congress on October 12, 2006 through the National Heritage Areas Act of 2006.

The Gullah-Geechee Cultural Heritage Corridor was the result of more than 15 years of research of a Gullah-Geechee descendant Derek Hankerson, Kristopher Smith, Diane Miller and others. They established the Gullah-Geechee Cultural Heritage Corridor, spanning from Pender County, NC, to St. Johns County, FL in 2006 and helped raise Fort Mose in St. Augustine as both a national historical site and part of the corridor.

The Gullah-Geechee Cultural Heritage Corridor extends along the coast of the southeastern United States through North Carolina, South Carolina, Georgia and Florida in recognition of the Gullah-Geechee people and culture. Gullah-Geechee are direct descendants of West African slaves brought into the United States around the 1700s. They were forced to work in rice paddies, cotton fields and indigo plantations along the South Carolina-Georgia seaboard where the warm and moist climate conditions helped them to preserve many African traditions . After the abolition of slavery, Gullah-Geechee people settled in remote villages around the coastal swath, where, thanks to their relative isolation, they formed strong communal ties and a unique culture that has endured for centuries.

The corridor is administered as a National Heritage Area in partnership between the National Park Service and local governments and cultural and tourism authorities.

The corridor is specifically focused on 79 Atlantic barrier islands within the designated area and their African-American inhabitants, and adjoining areas within  of the coastline. The corridor includes Charles Pinckney National Historic Site, from which it is administered.

References

External links
 Gullah/Geechee Cultural Heritage Corridor National Park Service
 Gullah Geechee Cultural Heritage Corridor Management Plan National Park Service

National Heritage Areas of the United States
Gullah culture
Protected areas established in 2006
2006 establishments in North Carolina
2006 establishments in South Carolina
2006 establishments in Georgia (U.S. state)
2006 establishments in Florida
African-American historic places
African-American cultural history
African-American tourist attractions in Florida
African-American tourist attractions in the United States
Gullah country
Regions of the Southern United States